Liszkowo may refer to the following places:
Liszkowo, Greater Poland Voivodeship (west-central Poland)
Liszkowo, Kuyavian-Pomeranian Voivodeship (north-central Poland)
Liszkowo, Koszalin County in West Pomeranian Voivodeship (north-west Poland)
Liszkowo, Szczecinek County in West Pomeranian Voivodeship (north-west Poland)